Ruth Lauren Smeeth, Baroness Anderson of Stoke-on-Trent (née Anderson; born 29 June 1979) is a British  Labour Party politician who was the Member of Parliament (MP) for Stoke-on-Trent North from 2015 until 2019. Since 2022 she has been a member of the House of Lords.

Early life
Smeeth was born in Edinburgh, Scotland. Her mother is from east London, and her father is a Scottish trade unionist. Her maternal family is Jewish, and arrived in London during the 1890s, having escaped Russian pogroms. However, she had no contact with her father after her parents divorced when she was aged three.

Smeeth attended school and taught at a Jewish school in Bristol, where her mother was later deputy general secretary for Amicus, and in her early life travelled extensively across the UK due to her mother's work.

Smeeth graduated with a degree in Politics and International Relations from the University of Birmingham in 2000. She worked as a policy and research officer for a trade union before working in a public relations role from January 2004 to September 2005 at Sodexo. She then became director of public affairs and campaigns at the Britain Israel Communications and Research Centre (BICOM) in November 2005, leaving in early 2007 to work in PR for Nestlé.

From 2010 to 2015, she was a deputy director of anti-racist organisation, Hope not Hate. She has also been employed by the Community Security Trust and has worked for the Board of Deputies of British Jews.

Parliamentary career

Smeeth was selected as Labour Party candidate for the Burton constituency in the 2010 general election, finishing 6,304 votes behind Andrew Griffiths of the Conservative Party. She was subsequently selected from an all-women shortlist to be Labour Party candidate for Stoke-on-Trent North, following the retirement of incumbent Labour MP Joan Walley, and was subsequently elected at the 2015 general election.

Smeeth was named in a 2009 US embassy communiqué as a source to "strictly protect", following her divulging details of Prime Minister Gordon Brown's intentions around calling an election in late 2009.

Smeeth backed Yvette Cooper in the 2015 Labour Leadership Election

In October 2015, Smeeth was given an adjournment debate on holiday hunger.

In June 2016, Smeeth resigned her post as Parliamentary Private Secretary (PPS) to the shadow Northern Ireland and Scotland teams, alongside others, in protest at Jeremy Corbyn's leadership. She supported Owen Smith in the failed attempt to replace him in the 2016 Labour Party (UK) leadership election.

In June 2016, Smeeth campaigned for the UK to remain in the European Union. Her constituency voted for Brexit by 72.1%. In November 2016, Smeeth said "I’ll be voting for us to move to Article 50. The general public, especially in Stoke-on-Trent, sent a very clear message with some parts of my constituency voting 80/20 to leave. My whole priority and focus is how we can make it work".

In June 2016, at the launch of the Chakrabarti Report, Marc Wadsworth, a Labour Party activist, described Smeeth as working "hand-in-hand" with Kate McCann of The Daily Telegraph, after McCann passed Smeeth his press release. Smeeth later issued a statement that Wadsworth was using "traditional antisemitic slurs to attack me for being part of a 'media conspiracy'" and criticised a lack of response from Corbyn or his office, calling on him to resign. However, the incident was caught on video and Wadsworth didn't mention a general “media conspiracy”, or anything about Jews. Wadsworth said he was unaware Smeeth was Jewish and that "I’ve never been called anti-semitic in my life...The Jewish people have an ally in me.” Smeeth said that she received 25,000 pieces of abuse during July and August, including 20,000 in the 12-hour period immediately following the incident.  However, the Jewish Voice for Labour group contested this  by comparing Smeeth's claim with a study by the Community Service Trust who monitor anti-Semitic and abusive media content. The study found that over an entire year (encompassing the 12 hour period of Smeeth's claim of 20,000 cases) only 9,008 original Tweets concerning Jews were classified as antagonistic. Other studies investigating the most abused MPs on Twitter found that Smeeth wasn't mentioned since she didn't exceed the threshold of abuse to be ranked. In July 2020, Wadsworth referred to Smeeth as a "pro-Israeli government zealot".

The police strengthened her security after she received a death threat. In April 2018, Smeeth was accompanied by around 40 Labour MPs and peers to a Labour hearing into Wadsworth's conduct. Wadsworth was expelled for bringing the Party into disrepute.

She retained her seat in the 2017 general election with a much reduced majority.

In March 2019, Smeeth resigned as PPS to Tom Watson, Deputy Leader of the Labour Party to vote against a second referendum on Brexit, as Labour had instructed its MPs to abstain.

In April 2019, Smeeth was elected Parliamentary Chair of the Jewish Labour Movement. She is a member of Labour Friends of Israel.

In the December 2019 general election, Smeeth lost her seat to Conservative Jonathan Gullis, who overturned her 2,359, or five per cent, majority to a 15% or 6,286 majority of his own.

Smeeth endorsed Ian Murray in the 2020 Labour Party deputy leadership election.

It was announced on 14 October 2022, that as part of the 2022 Special Honours, Smeeth would receive a life peerage. On 18 November 2022, she was created  Baroness Anderson of Stoke-on-Trent, of Stoke-on-Trent in the County of Staffordshire.

Personal life
Smeeth was married to Michael Smeeth, a business executive. She describes herself as 'culturally Jewish'. Since 2015, she has been a board member of Hope not Hate.

In June 2020, she became chief executive of Index on Censorship, an organisation which campaigns for freedom of speech.

Smeeth was appointed an Honorary Captain in the Royal Naval Reserve in July 2021.

References

External links

1979 births
Living people
Alumni of the University of Birmingham
British public relations people
Female members of the Parliament of the United Kingdom for English constituencies
Jewish British politicians
Jewish women politicians
Labour Party (UK) MPs for English constituencies
Labour Friends of Israel
Politicians from Edinburgh
UK MPs 2015–2017
UK MPs 2017–2019
21st-century British politicians
21st-century British women politicians
Scottish Jews
Royal Naval Reserve personnel
Labour Party (UK) life peers
UK MPs who were granted peerages
Life peers created by Charles III
Life peeresses created by Charles III